Dongnan Linshen Area (lit. Southeast Near-Shenzhen Area) is a designated area for city planning of Dongguan, Guangdong province, China.

Economy 
Underwear manufacturer Cosmo Lady's head office is in Fengdeling Village, Fenggang Town, Dongnan District.

References 

 

County-level divisions of Guangdong
Geography of Dongguan